Lord Copper may refer to:
 Lord Copper, character in Scoop (novel) by Evelyn Waugh
 Lord Cowper (died 1723), judge in Dudley v Dudley

See also
 Lord Cooper (disambiguation)
 Copper (disambiguation)